Yervand Manaryan (September 20, 1924 – February 19, 2020) was an Iranian-born Armenian actor.

Manaryan was born in Arak, Iran in 1924 in a family from Agulis, Nakhichevan. In 1946 his family repatriated to Soviet Armenia along with thousands of other Iranian Armenians. He was an atheist.

The actor was a member of the Armenian National Congress of former President Levon Ter-Petrosyan.

Manaryan died in February 2020, aged 95.

Filmography
According to IMDb 
Karine (1969)
Morgan's Relative (1970)
Chaos (1974)
A Bride from the North (1975)
Priekhali na konkurs povara... (1977)
Arevik (1978)
Captain Arakel (1986)
Comrade Panjuni (1992)
Le piano (2011)
Garegin Nzhdeh (2013)

Awards 

 Honored Artist of Armenia (2003)
 Artavazd Award of the UTEA (2005)
 Honorary Citizen of Yerevan (2019)

References

1924 births
2020 deaths
20th-century Armenian male actors
Iranian people of Armenian descent
Iranian emigrants to the Soviet Union
People from Arak, Iran
21st-century Armenian male actors
Armenian atheists
Armenian male film actors
People from Nakhchivan